NGC 6204 is an open cluster in the constellation Ara, lying close to the galactic equator. It is 3,540 ly (1,085 pc) distant from Earth. The cluster was discovered on 13 May 1826 by British astronomer James Dunlop.

References

Further reading
 Carraro, Giovanni; Munari, Ulisse (2004): A multicolour CCD photometric study of the open clusters NGC 2866, Pismis 19, Westerlund 2, ESO96-SC04, NGC 5617 and NGC 6204; Monthly Notices of the Royal Astronomical Society 347 (2), S. 625–631

External links
 
 http://seds.org/
 
 Image NGC 6204

NGC 6204
6204
Ara (constellation)
Astronomical objects discovered in 1826